Jacksonburg is an unincorporated community in Harrison Township, Wayne County, in the U.S. state of Indiana.

History
Jacksonburg was laid out and platted in 1815.

A post office was established at Jacksonburg in 1822, and remained in operation until it was discontinued in 1903.

Geography

Notable residents
Politician Abner M. Bradbury resided in Jacksonburg. He is buried at the Jacksonburg Cemetery.

References

Unincorporated communities in Wayne County, Indiana
Unincorporated communities in Indiana